Molybdenum hexacarbonyl (also called molybdenum carbonyl) is the chemical compound with the formula Mo(CO)6. This colorless solid, like its chromium and tungsten analogues, is noteworthy as a volatile, air-stable derivative of a metal in its zero oxidation state.

Structure and properties
Mo(CO)6 adopts an octahedral geometry consisting of six rod-like CO ligands radiating from the central Mo atom.  A recurring minor debate in some chemical circles concerns the definition of an "organometallic" compound.  Usually, organometallic indicates the presence of a metal directly bonded via a M–C bond to an organic fragment, which must in turn have a C–H bond.

Mo(CO)6 is prepared by the reduction of molybdenum chlorides or oxides under a pressure of carbon monoxide, although it would be unusual to prepare this inexpensive compound in the laboratory.  The compound is somewhat air-stable and sparingly soluble in nonpolar organic solvents.

Occurrence
Mo(CO)6 has been detected in landfills and sewage plants, the reducing, anaerobic environment being conducive to formation of Mo(CO)6.

Inorganic and organometallic research
Molybdenum hexacarbonyl is a popular reagent in academic research.

One or more CO ligands can be displaced by other ligands. Mo(CO)6, [Mo(CO)3(MeCN)3], and related derivatives are employed as catalysts in organic synthesis for example, alkyne metathesis and the Pauson–Khand reaction.

Mo(CO)6 reacts with 2,2′-bipyridine to afford Mo(CO)4(bipy).  UV-photolysis of a THF solution of Mo(CO)6 gives Mo(CO)5(THF).

[Mo(CO)4(piperidine)2]
The thermal reaction of Mo(CO)6 with piperidine affords Mo(CO)4(piperidine)2.  The two piperidine ligands in this yellow-colored compound are labile,  which allows other ligands to be introduced under mild conditions. For instance, the reaction of [Mo(CO)4(piperidine)2] with triphenyl phosphine in boiling dichloromethane (b.p. ca. 40 °C) gives cis-[Mo(CO)4(PPh3)2]. This cis- complex isomerizes in toluene to trans-[Mo(CO)4(PPh3)2].

[Mo(CO)3(MeCN)3]
Mo(CO)6 also can be converted to its tris(acetonitrile) derivative.  The compound serves as a source of "Mo(CO)3".  For instance treatment with allyl chloride gives [MoCl(allyl)(CO)2(MeCN)2], whereas treatment with KTp and sodium cyclopentadienide gives [MoTp(CO)3]− and [MoCp(CO)3]− anions, respectively. These anions react with a variety of electrophiles.  A related source of Mo(CO)3 is cycloheptatrienemolybdenum tricarbonyl.

Source of Mo atoms
Molybdenum hexacarbonyl is widely used in electron beam-induced deposition technique - it is easily vaporized and decomposed by the electron beam providing a convenient source of molybdenum atoms.

Safety and handling
Like all metal carbonyls, Mo(CO)6 is a dangerous source of volatile metal as well as CO.

References

Further reading
 
 
 

Molybdenum(0) compounds
Carbonyl complexes
Organomolybdenum compounds
Octahedral compounds